The year 1839 in architecture involved some significant architectural events and new buildings.

Events
 May – Cambridge Camden Society is established in England by John Mason Neale, Alexander Hope and Benjamin Webb to promote Gothic architecture; also this year the Oxfordshire Architectural and Historical Society is founded as the Society for Promoting the Study of Gothic Architecture.

Buildings and structures

Buildings completed

 Ponce Cathedral, Puerto Rico
 St Mary's Church, Derby, England (Roman Catholic), designed by Augustus Pugin
 St Francis Xavier Church, Hereford, England (Roman Catholic), designed by Charles Day
 Upper Brook Street Chapel, Manchester, England (Unitarian), designed by Charles Barry
 Halifax County Courthouse (Virginia), designed by Dabney Cosby
 Old Customshouse (Erie, Pennsylvania), designed by William Kelly
 Lyceum (Alexandria, Virginia)
 Åbo Svenska Teater, Åbo (Turku), Finland
 Pulkovo Observatory, Russia
 Söderarm, lighthouse, Sweden
 Nine Elms railway station, London, designed by William Tite
 Avon, Maidenhead and Moulsford Railway Bridges on the Great Western Railway of England, designed by Isambard Kingdom Brunel
 Queen's Tower (Sheffield), England, a house designed by Woodhead & Hurst
 Wrest Park near Silsoe, Bedfordshire, England, a house designed by Thomas de Grey, 2nd Earl de Grey, for himself

Awards
 Grand Prix de Rome, architecture: Hector Lefuel.

Births
 May 17 – Alexander Davidson, Scottish architect active in Australia (died 1908)
 June 13
 Robert William Edis, English architect and interior decorator (died 1927)
 Ernest George, English architect and painter (died 1922)
 October 29 – Imre Steindl, Hungarian architect (died 1902)
 November 12 – Frank Furness, American architect (died 1912)

Deaths
 January 24 – Michele Cachia, Maltese architect and military engineer (born 1760)
 May 22 – William Atkinson, English Gothic Revival country house architect (born 1774/5)
 August 31 – William Wilkins, English architect, classical scholar and archaeologist (born 1778)
 November 15 – Giocondo Albertolli, Swiss-born architect, painter and sculptor active in Italy (born 1743)

References

Architecture
Years in architecture
19th-century architecture